Joseph Cooper may refer to:

 Joseph Cooper (pirate) (died 1725), pirate active in the Caribbean
 Joseph Cooper (broadcaster) (1912–2001), English pianist and broadcaster
 Joseph Cooper (cyclist) (born 1985), New Zealand cyclist
 Joseph Alexander Cooper (1823–1910), American soldier
 Joseph F. Cooper, American jurist
 Joseph Nargba Cooper (1918–1975), Liberian politician
 Joseph Cooper, the protagonist in the 2014 film Interstellar

See also 
 Joseph Cooper House, a historic house in Camden, New Jersey, United States
 Joe Cooper (disambiguation)